FIE Foundation is a charity trust established in 1970, belongs to 'Fie Group of Industries' Ichalkaranji, in Maharashtra State of India.

Background

Mr. P. D. Kulkarni ( Panditkaka Daji Kulkarni), The Chairman of FIE Group, who was also the trustee of FIE Foundation, established the FIE Foundation trust a sole vision of recognizing & awarding eminent personalities of India in different fields for their contribution to the nation and society. And also recognizing and to encourage budding talents in different fields.
Mr. P.D. Kulkarni died on 6th July 2020 at the age of 93 years in Kolhapur in Maharashtra.
The awards are generally selected form the following fields:  Engineering, Science & Technology, Humanities, Education, Agriculture, Music & Arts, Sports, Literature, Child Artist and Local talents.

The highest award conferred is Rashtrabhushan Award. The awards are given every year in a grand ceremony held in Ichalkaranji in January/February at the hands of eminent dignitaries. A few of Chief guests who have graced the occasion are hon'ble Ex. Prime minister of India Chandrashekhar, hon'ble Ex. Chief Minister of Maharashtra Manohar Joshi,  Dilip Kumar( well-known Cine actor),  Rahul Bajaj, (well-known industrialist).

Rashtrabhushan Awardees

Sumant Moolgaokar (Architect of Tata Motor),  Jayant Narlikar,  S. L. Kirloskar,  Krishnaswami Kasturirangan,  Dr. Raja Ramanna,  Russy Modi,  Navalmal Firodiya,  Aditya Birla,  Ratan Tata, Rahul Bajaj,  H. P. Nanda,  Jayaprakash Narayan, Baba Amte, Lata Mangeshkar,  Tarkteerth Laxmanshastri Joshi,  Nanasaheb Gore,  Ashok Kumar,  T. N. Seshan, Keshub Mahindra,  Dr. R. N. Dandekar,  Pandurang Shastri Athavale, B. R. Chopra, Kamal Haasan, Narayan Murthy, Hema Malini, Dr. Sudha Murthy (Infosys Foundation chairperson), Rajeev Bajaj, Ramoji Rao, Brijmohan Munjal

National Awardees
  Byron Damania ( high speed indigenous spindle 60,000rpm)
  Kapil Dev ( Sports)
 Shriram Bhavsar (sports) 
  Rajdeep Sardesai (Journalism)
  Vinita Singhania (Industry)
  Vasant Purushottam Kale (Literature)
  Shobhaa De (Writer)
  Siddharth Kak (T.V. Personality)
  Yash Pal
  Byron Damania ( CNC Controller)
  S. D. Kulkarni (Industry)
  S. K. Mohanty (Language Technology)
  Veerendra Heggade (Education)
  Naresh Goyal (Engineering)
  Mallika Sarabhai (Performing Arts)
  Nana Chudasama (Social )
  Vitthal Kamat (Industry)
  Nilu Phule (Arts)
  Veena Patil (Industry)

IMTEX Awards

IMTEX' is an International Machine Tool Exhibition, organised every three years by Indian Machine tool Manufacturing Association of India. It is one of the biggest Machine Tool exhibition in Asia & in recent years with participation of well-known companies of Europe, Japan, and U.S.A. etc.,this exhibition has become truly an international event for Machine Tools & accessories.

FIE Foundation takes this opportunity to present awards for latest technical innovations in Machine Tools exhibited in IMTEX to recognize, appreciate and encourage Ideas, Innovations and Vision in Machine Tool technology. The awards are given away in a ceremony during IMTEX.

 2009- ALFA SYSTEMS PVT LTD

References

Foundations based in India
Organisations based in Maharashtra
Organizations established in 1970
Non-profit organisations based in India
Ichalkaranji
1970 establishments in Maharashtra